New Vibe Man in Town is the debut album by vibraphonist Gary Burton recorded in 1961 and released on the RCA label. It features Burton in a trio with bassist Gene Cherico and drummer Joe Morello (of Dave Brubeck fame).

Reception 
The Allmusic review by Scott Yanow stated: "Vibraphonist Gary Burton's debut as a leader shows that he was a brilliant player from the start of his career... This boppish set is easily recommended".

Track listing 
 "Joy Spring" (Clifford Brown) - 3:39 
 "Over the Rainbow" (Harold Arlen, Yip Harburg) - 4:21 
 "Like Someone in Love" (Johnny Burke, Jimmy van Heusen) - 3:05 
 "Minor Blues" (Arif Mardin) - 5:30 
 "Our Waltz" (David Rose) - 4:30 
 "So Many Things" (Marian McPartland) - 4:14 
 "Sir John" (Blue Mitchell) - 4:10 
 "You Stepped Out of a Dream" (Nacio Herb Brown, Gus Kahn) - 4:28 
Recorded at RCA Victor's Studio B in New York City on July 6 & 7, 1961.

Personnel 
 Gary Burton — vibraphone
 Gene Cherico — bass  
 Joe Morello — drums

References 

RCA Records albums
Gary Burton albums
1961 debut albums
Albums produced by George Avakian